is a Japanese football player. He plays for SC Sagamihara.

Club statistics
Updated to 23 February 2018.

References

External links

Profile at SC Sagamihara

1996 births
Living people
Association football people from Tokyo
Japanese footballers
J2 League players
J3 League players
Mito HollyHock players
J.League U-22 Selection players
SC Sagamihara players
Association football defenders